The Miramonte League is a high school athletic league that is part of the CIF Southern Section. Members are located in the eastern San Gabriel Valley in Los Angeles County.

Members
 Edgewood High School
 Bassett High School
 Ganesha High School
 Garey High School
 La Puente High School 
 Pomona High School

References

CIF Southern Section leagues